US Post Office-Freeport is a historic post office building located at Freeport in the town of Hempstead, Nassau County, New York, United States. It was built in 1932 and designed by consulting architects Tachau and Vought for the Office of the Supervising Architect.  It is a two-story, symmetrically massed brick building trimmed in limestone in the Colonial Revival style. It features a three bay wide entrance pavilion with a gable roof.  The lobby features two murals by William Gropper installed in 1938 and titled "Air Mail" and "Suburban Post in Winter."

It was listed on the National Register of Historic Places in 1989.

References

External links

Freeport
Government buildings completed in 1932
Colonial Revival architecture in New York (state)
Freeport, New York
Buildings and structures in Nassau County, New York
National Register of Historic Places in Hempstead (town), New York
Treasury Relief Art Project